Saša Tomanović (born 20 September 1989) is a Serbian football midfielder who plays for TSC Bačka Topola.

References

External links
 
 Saša Tomanović stats at utakmica.rs 
 

1989 births
Living people
Sportspeople from Sombor
Association football midfielders
Serbian footballers
Serbian expatriate footballers
FK Mladost Apatin players
FK Inđija players
FK Radnički Sombor players
OFK Titograd players
FK Javor Ivanjica players
Serbian SuperLiga players
Serbian First League players
Montenegrin First League players
Serbian expatriate sportspeople in Montenegro
Expatriate footballers in Montenegro